David or Dave Condon may refer to:

David Condon, politician
David Condon (field hockey)
Dave Condon, musician in White Tomb and Altar of Plagues
Dave Condon (writer) in Chicagoland Sports Hall of Fame